Penicillium philippinense is a species of fungus in the genus Penicillium.

References

philippinense
Fungi described in 1972